Taffy Sinclair may refer to:

 Dr Taffy Sinclair, a character in The Metatemporal Detective by Michael Moorcock
 Taffy Sinclair, a character in The Fabulous Five and other works by Betsy Haynes